Cheung is a Cantonese romanization of several Chinese surnames, including the one written as  in Traditional characters and  in Simplified characters (Jyutping: Zoeng1; Pinyin: Zhāng; Wade–Giles: Chang, Vietnamese: Trương), and the one written in both Traditional characters and Simplified characters as  (zoeng1). Sometimes,  is also spelled as Cheung instead of Chiang/Jiang due to its Cantonese pronunciation.

It is a fairly common American surname, listed 3,672th during the 1990 US Census and 2,069th during the year 2000 US Census.

List of people with the surname
張 and 张

 Andrew Cheung, Hong Kong judge and jurist
 Cecilia Cheung, Hong Kong actress and singer
 Cheung Chi Doy, Hong Kong-born footballer who represented Republic of China (Taiwan)
 Cheung Chi Wai, Hong Kong-born footballer who represented Republic of China (Taiwan) 
 Dicky Cheung, Hong Kong actor and singer
 Jacky Cheung, Hong Kong actor and singer
 Karin Anna Cheung, American actress, singer, and songwriter
 Leslie Cheung (1956–2003), Hong Kong actor and musician
 Louis Cheung, Hong Kong actor, singer, and songwriter
 Maggie Cheung, Hong Kong-British actress
 Margaret Chung (1889–1959), American physician
 Rachel Cheung (1991–), Hong Kong classical pianist
 Sharla Cheung or Cheung Man, Hong Kong actress
 Steven Ng-Sheong Cheung (1935–), Chinese economist
 Cheung Tat-ming (1964–), Hong Kong actor, comedian, director, and writer
 Teresa Cheung, Hong Kong singer
 Cheung Ka Long, Fencing

See also
 Zhang/Chang, for more about the surname within China
 Teoh, for general of Chinese people within Singapore, Malaysia and some other South-East Asia countries

References

Chinese-language surnames
Multiple Chinese surnames